Donnamaria Bruton (May 3, 1954 - September 9, 2012) was a painter and faculty member at the Rhode Island School of Design, known for her mixed media paintings and collages. Bruton worked at RISD starting in 1992, serving as Painting Department head from 2001–03, and as interim dean of Graduate Studies from 2003–05.

Bruton's style, described by The Providence Journal as "a loose free-flowing style.... but with a strong realistic streak," makes use of her drawing, painting and collage skills. Many of her collages employ mundane objects as the key to getting at a deeper memory or concept. Her first solo exhibit was in 1993 in Austin, Texas, and was well-received. Later in her career, the size of her works expanded, many to canvases .

Bruton received the Blanche E. Colman Award from BNY Mellon in 1999. Her work is part of the permanent collection at the RISD Museum and the Gwanjiu Museum in Korea, as well as several private collections. Bruton's work is in the permanent collection of the Newport Art Museum.

Early life and education
Bruton was born in Milwaukee, Wisconsin, in 1954. Her father was baseball player Bill Bruton, and her grandfather on her mother's side was Negro leagues player Judy Johnson. She received a Bachelor of Fine Arts from Michigan State University, and a Master of Fine Arts from Yale University. She studied under painter Edward Loper and exhibited with Dell Pryor in Detroit. She married Timothy Coutis in January 1999.

References

1954 births
2012 deaths
Artists from Milwaukee
Yale School of Art alumni
Michigan State University alumni
Rhode Island School of Design faculty
American contemporary painters
African-American contemporary artists
American contemporary artists
African-American women artists
African-American painters
American women painters
21st-century American painters
21st-century American women artists
American women academics
21st-century African-American women
21st-century African-American artists
20th-century African-American people
20th-century African-American women